, provisional designation , is a bright mini-asteroid, classified as near-Earth object of the Amor group, approximately 84 meters in diameter. It was discovered on 12 December 1996, by astronomers of the Spacewatch program at the Kitt Peak National Observatory near of Tucson, Arizona, United States.

Description 

 is classified as an Amor asteroid because its perihelion is less than 1.3 AU and does not cross Earth's orbit. The asteroid is on a low-eccentricity and low-inclination orbit between the orbits of Earth and Mars. This is within a region of stability where bodies may survive for the age of the Solar System, and hence it may have formed near its current orbit.

It orbits the Sun at a distance of 1.1–1.3 AU once every 1 years and 4 months (474 days; semi-major axis of 1.19 AU). Its orbit has an eccentricity of 0.06 and an inclination of 2° with respect to the ecliptic. The body's observation arc begins with its official discovery observation at Kitt Peak in December 1996.

Between 1900 and 2200 its closest approach with Earth is more than 0.11 AU.

See also

References

External links 
 
 
 

225312
225312
225312
19961212